Mike Walsh may refer to:
 Mike Walsh (TV host) (born 1938), host of the Australian television program The Mike Walsh Show
 Mike Walsh (UP), executive for Union Pacific Railroad named Railroader of the Year for 1991 by Railway Age magazine
 Mike Walsh (footballer) (born 1956), football defender
 Mike Walsh (ice hockey) (born 1962), former National Hockey League ice hockey player for the New York Islanders
 Mike Walsh (umpire) (1850–1929), baseball umpire and manager
 Mike Walsh (diplomat) (born 1963), New Zealand diplomat

See also
 Michael Walsh (disambiguation)